Víctor Hugo Marchesini (born November 3, 1960 in Gualeguaychú (Entre Ríos), Argentina) is a former Argentine footballer and manager who played for Boca Juniors and Ferro Carril Oeste in Argentina and The Strongest in Bolivia. He played as a centre back.

Teams (Player)
 Ferro Carril Oeste 1981-1988
 Boca Juniors 1989-1992
 The Strongest 1992-1993
 Ferro Carril Oeste 1993-1995

Teams (Manager)
 Leganés 2004
 Olmedo 2007
 Universidad Católica (Quito) 2008
 Macará 2009-2010
 Unión San Felipe 2011
 Boca Juniors (Inferiors) 2012–present

Titles
 Ferro Carril Oeste 1984 (Torneo Nacional Primera División Argentina)
 Boca Juniors 1989 (Supercopa Sudamericana), 1990 (Recopa Sudamericana), 1992 (Copa Máster Sudamericana y Torneo Apertura Primera División Argentina)

References
 

1960 births
Living people
Argentine people of Italian descent
Argentine footballers
Argentine expatriate footballers
Argentine football managers
Ferro Carril Oeste footballers
Boca Juniors footballers
The Strongest players
Argentine Primera División players
Expatriate footballers in Bolivia
Expatriate football managers in Spain
Expatriate football managers in Chile
Expatriate football managers in Ecuador
CD Leganés managers
Association football central defenders
Sportspeople from Entre Ríos Province
C.S.D. Macará managers
C.D. Olmedo managers